{{DISPLAYTITLE:C16H24O4}}
The molecular formula C16H24O4 (molar mass: 280.36 g/mol, exact mass: 280.1675 u) may refer to:

 Brefeldin A
 Fumarranol

Molecular formulas